Alariaceae are a family of brown algae in the order Laminariales.

Genera
 Alaria
 Eualaria
 Lessoniopsis
 Pleurophycus
 Pterygophora
 Undaria (e.g. wakame)
 Undariella

Distribution
The distribution of Alariaceae includes the northeastern Pacific Ocean, South Africa, southern Australia, and New Zealand coasts.

References

Further reading

External links

 
Brown algae families